Gilles Simon was the defending champion, but lost in the first round to Teymuraz Gabashvili.

Nick Kyrgios won his first ATP title, defeating Marin Čilić in the final, 6–2, 7–6(7–3).

Seeds
The top four seeds receive a bye into the second round.

Draw

Finals

Top half

Bottom half

Qualifying

Seeds

Qualifiers

Lucky loser
  David Guez

Qualifying draw

First qualifier

Second qualifier

Third qualifier

Fourth qualifier

References
 Main Draw
 Qualifying Draw

Open 13 Provence - Singles
2016 Singles